Bemisal (English: unparalleled, or, unprecedented) is a 1982 drama film produced by Debesh Gosh and directed by Hrishikesh Mukherjee. The film stars Amitabh Bachchan, Vinod Mehra, Raakhee, Deven Verma, Aruna Irani and Om Shivpuri. The music was by R.D. Burman.

It is a remake of  Uttam Kumar's Bengali classic Ami Se O Shakha (1975), which was also based on the Bengali story of the same name by Ashutosh Mukherjee. When a deprived boy, brought up in a privileged family and indebted for virtually everything he has, lands in a perplexing situation, life seems unfair to him. There are very few who actually appreciate benevolence showered on them. When it comes to repay such debt, many of us try to find excuses to avoid the difficult situation. But the protagonist of this movie is a noble individual, an ideal hero, who knows that everything he has in life, is owed to a family and when he finds himself in a situation where he has to give up his love and profession, he doesn't look back.

This was the last movie Hrishikesh Mukherjee did with Amitabh Bachchan as a Director. However, their last venture together was Coolie (1983 Hindi film) where Hrishikesh Mukherjee was the editor.

Plot 
Dr. Sudhir Roy (Amitabh Bachchan) and Dr. Prashant Chaturvedi (Vinod Mehra) meet Ms. Kavita Goel (Raakhee) on a holiday and start meeting her regularly. Though he himself was interested in Kavita, Sudhir recommends Prashant to her for marriage. When she asks why he himself can't marry her, Sudhir narrates his flashback.

Sudhir was the second son of a poor school teacher and hopes that his big brother would get a job and provide for them. But when his big brother becomes mentally ill and his father dies, he resorts to petty thieving. When police catch him, the Magistrate recognizes him and adopts him. Sudhir grows up along with the magistrate's son Prashant and receives same education and becomes a pediatrician. Now he tells her that he can't marry her on medical grounds as his brother was a psychiatric patient and he has a criminal background.

Kavita and Prashant marry and Prashant leaves for America for higher studies, while Sudhir stays in Bombay to take care of the magistrate and Kavita. After coming back, Prashant starts a medical practice and charges more money from patients, especially to do illegal abortions. Sudhir tries to reason with him, but he wouldn't listen. One day, Prashant's patient dies during an abortion and he gets arrested. Sudhir tells police that he was the actual culprit and changes all hospital records to prove that. In return, he takes the word of Prashant and Kavita to use medical profession to serve people, not to earn money. They give him their word and do exactly the same. Sudhir gets a nine-year sentence and loses his medical registration.

After nine years, Kavita and Prashant welcome Sudhir from jail along with their son.

Cast 
 Amitabh Bachchan as Dr. Sudhir Roy and Adhir Roy (brothers)
 Vinod Mehra as Dr. Prashant Chaturvedi
 Raakhee as Kavita Chaturvedi (née Goel) 
 A.K. Hangal as Dr. Ramnarayan Goel
 Om Shivpuri as Magistrate Chaturvedi
 Deven Verma as Hiralal
 Sheetal as Ruby Dutt
 Anjan Srivastav as doctor
 Goga Kapoor as Ruby's father
 Aruna Irani as Nandani Malhotra
 Asit Sen as Dr. Agarwal
 Pratima Devi as Dr. Goel's sister
 Master Mayur as young Sudhir
 Baby Khushbu as Meena
 Master Vikas as boy child patient
Harindranath Chattopadhyay as party guest

Production

Filming
Some scenes of Bemisaal were shot in Kashmir valley like in Sonmarg, Pahalgam. Bemisaal was one of the last films to be shot in Kashmir before the advent of militancy.

Awards 

 30th Filmfare Awards:

Won

 Best Cinematography – Jaywant Pathare

Nominated

 Best Actor – Amitabh Bachchan
 Best Supporting Actor – Vinod Mehra

Soundtrack 
The Soundtrack of the film was composed by R. D. Burman and the lyrics were penned by Anand Bakshi. Singers like Kishore Kumar, Lata Mangeshkar and Suresh Wadkar lent their voices for the songs of the film. The soundtrack has 4 songs and 2 instrumental versions. The songs are even popular today with the masses. The soundtrack was released in 1982.

References

External links
 

Films scored by R. D. Burman
1982 films
1980s Hindi-language films
Films directed by Hrishikesh Mukherjee
Hindi remakes of Bengali films
Films based on works by Ashutosh Mukhopadhyay